Josefa "Chipita" Rodriguez (December 30, 1799 – November 13, 1863) was convicted of murder and hanged in San Patricio County, Texas, at the age of 63. More than a century later, on June 13, 1985, the Texas Legislature passed a resolution noting that Rodriguez did not receive a fair trial. She has been the subject of two operas, numerous books, newspaper articles, and magazine accounts.

Trial and execution 
Rodriguez was reportedly born December 30, 1799, in what was then the Spanish province of Nuevo Santander within the Viceroyalty of New Spain. She was a woman from the South Texas town of San Patricio who furnished travelers with meals and a cot on the porch of her lean-to on the Nueces River. She was accused of robbing and murdering a trader named John Savage with an axe. However, the $600 of gold stolen from him was found down river, where Savage's body was discovered in a burlap bag. She and Juan Silvera (who was possibly her illegitimate son) were indicted on circumstantial evidence and tried before 14th District Court judge Benjamin F. Neal  at San Patricio. Although Rodriguez maintained her innocence, she refused to testify in her defense and remained silent throughout the trial, perhaps, some have speculated, to protect her guilty son. Although the jury recommended mercy, Neal ordered her executed. She was hanged on Friday, November 13, 1863. She was 63 at the time of her death. Her last words were quoted as being, "No soy culpable" (I am not guilty).
At least one witness to the hanging claimed to have heard a moan from the coffin, which was placed in an unmarked grave. Her ghost is said to haunt San Patricio, especially when a woman is to be executed. Rodriguez is depicted as a spectre with a noose around her neck, riding through the mesquite trees or wailing from the riverbottoms.

Cultural references 
Chipita Rodriguez has become a folk legend, and since the 1930s, there have been numerous alleged sightings of her ghost along the Nueces River where she was hanged.

Rodriguez has been the subject of numerous books and newspaper articles. Rachel Bluntzer Hebert's epic-length poem "Shadows on the Nueces" and Teresa Palomo Acosta's poem "Chipita" both portray Rodriguez as a heroine. In 1993, the University of Texas music department performed the opera Chipita Rodriguez, composed by Texas A&M University-Corpus Christi professor Lawrence Weiner. In 2010 a screenplay was written by Del Mar College and Texas A&M University-Corpus Christi student screenwriter Alcario Cary Cadena.

See also 
 List of wrongful convictions in the United States
 Wrongful executions in the United States

References 

1799 births
1863 deaths
19th-century executions by Texas
19th-century American women
People executed by Texas by hanging
Axe murder
American people executed for murder
People convicted of murder by Texas
People executed by the Confederate States of America by hanging
19th-century executions of American people
19th-century executions by the United States
Executed American women
Executed Mexican women
American people of Mexican descent
American people wrongfully convicted of murder
Wrongful executions
Mexican ghosts
1863 murders in the United States